Jean P. Sasson (born 1950, Troy, Alabama, United States) is an American writer whose work mainly centers around women in the Middle East.

Biography
Growing up in a small town, Sasson found adventure between the pages of books. Her strong desire to uproot herself from her rural surroundings led her to jump at the opportunity to work and travel abroad. In 1978 she traveled to Saudi Arabia to work in the King Faisal Specialist Hospital in Riyadh as an administrative coordinator of medical affairs., where she met Peter Sasson, her future husband. They married in 1982 and Sasson left the hospital after four years of service, but the couple remained in Saudi Arabia until 1990.

During their time in the Middle East, the Sassons made many friends, including members of the royal Al-Saud family, who visited the hospital. The most notable of these friendships was between Sasson and "Princess Sultana", the princess about whose life The Princess Trilogy tells.

Sasson is currently based in Atlanta, Georgia.

Works
 The Rape of Kuwait  – Knightsbridge (January 1991)
 Ester's Child  – Windsor-Brooke (September 1, 2001)
 Mayada: Daughter of Iraq  – Dutton Adult (October 16, 2003)
 Love in a Torn Land  – Wiley (March 5, 2007)
 Growing Up bin Laden: Osama's Wife and Son Take Us Inside Their Secret World 	St. Martin's Press, (2009)
 For the Love of a Son: One Afghan Woman's Quest for Her Stolen Child  Bantam (February 1, 2011)
 Yasmeena's Choice: A True Story of War, Rape, Courage and Survival  – LDA (October 3, 2013)

Princess Sultana
 Princess: A True Story of Life Behind the Veil in Saudi Arabia  – Windsor-Brooke (March 1, 2001) Princess Sultana's Daughters  – Windsor-Brooke (March 1, 2001) (UK Title: Daughters of Arabia (Bantam, 2004)
 Princess Sultana's Circle  – Windsor-Brooke (May 1, 2002) (UK title: Desert Royal (Bantam, 2004)
 Princess, More Tears to Cry  – Transworld Doubleday UK (August 28, 2014)
 Princess, Secrets to Share  – Penguin Books (November 30, 2015)
 Princess, Stepping out of the Shadows  – Random House (August 1, 2019)

Awards and honors
 Princess was selected as one of the best  "500 Great Books by Women" 
 The New York Times Best Seller List
 The Sunday Times Best Seller List  
 Princess – chosen as an Alternate Selection of the Literary Guild Doubleday Book Club 
 Princess – chosen as A Reader's Digest Selection 
 Princess was a Bestseller in over 25 countries around the world 

Other worksAmerican Chick in Saudi Arabia'' (Kindle Edition only, not a full book)

References

External links
 Official Website
 Interview on C-span about Growing Up Bin Laden

Living people
1947 births
Writers from Alabama
People from Troy, Alabama
American women biographers
American women non-fiction writers
21st-century American women